Edmund Selous (14 August 1857 – 25 March 1934) was a British ornithologist and writer.  He was the younger brother of big-game hunter Frederick Selous. Born in London, the son of a wealthy stockbroker, Selous was educated privately and matriculated at Pembroke College, Cambridge in September 1877. He left without a degree and was admitted to the Middle Temple just over a year later and was called to the bar in 1881. He practised as a barrister only briefly before retiring to pursue the study of natural history and literature.  

Edmund married Fanny Margaret Maxwell (1863-1955) on 13 January 1886. Fanny was the eldest daughter of the novelist Mary Elizabeth Braddon (1835-1915) and publisher John Maxwell (1824-1895).

In 1888 they moved to Wiesbaden, Germany and then to Mildenhall in Suffolk in 1889. In the 1920s, they moved to the Weymouth village Wyke Regis in Dorset, where they lived in Wyke Castle.

Career

Selous started as a conventional naturalist, but developed a hatred of the killing of animals for scientific study and was a pioneer of bird-watching as a method of scientific study. He was a strong proponent of non-destructive bird-study as opposed to the collection of skins and eggs. In his book Bird Watching (Selous, 1901) he said:

The shooting of birds for so called scientific purposes, like building museum collections, he strongly rejected.

He was a solitary man and was not well known in ornithological circles.  He avoided both the company of ornithologists and reading their observations so as to base his conclusions entirely on his own observations.  He believed that every observed detail should be published and produced a number of ornithological books and papers as well as several other books on popular natural history and a natural history series for children.

Selous published a variety of books on natural history, especially birds, ranging from children's books to more serious ornithological works.  He travelled to southern Africa and India in his youth and later to Shetland, Sweden, the Netherlands, and Iceland to observe birds there.  He had a particular interest in bird behaviour, sexual selection and the problem of the coordinated flight manoeuvres of flocking birds, which he sought to explain through the idea of thought-transference. He continued bird-watching and writing until near the end of his life.

Bibliography

Books by Selous include:

 
 
 
  (illustrations by George Edward Lodge)
 
 
 
 
 
 
 
 
 
 
 
 
 
 
 
 

Selous also wrote several articles in journals:

References

Sources
 Simmons, K.E.L. (2004). Selous, Edmund (1857–1934), ornithologist and author. Oxford Dictionary of National Biography.
 Lack, D., 1958. Some British pioneers in ornithological research, 1859–1939. Ibis, 101(1), pp.71–81. 
 Nice, M.M., 1935. Edmund Selous – An Appreciation. Bird-Banding, 6, pp.90–96. 
 Simmons, K.E.L., 2008. Edmund Selous (1857–1934): fragments for a biography. Ibis, 126(4), pp.595–596.

External links 

 
 Edmund Selous: "Pittville's first bird-watcher" by John Simpson, on the website of Pittville History Works.

1857 births
1934 deaths
British ornithological writers
Alumni of Pembroke College, Cambridge
Animal cognition writers
British barristers
Scientists from London
People from Wiesbaden
People from Mildenhall, Suffolk